Zimbabwe Ezekiel Guti University (ZEGU) was established in 2012 in Bindura, Zimbabwe. It is the first Pentecostal University in Zimbabwe.

References

External links 
 Zimbabwe Ezekiel Guti University  website

Universities and colleges in Zimbabwe